Joseph Leonard Griffiths was a professional football winger. He played in the Football League for Bury, Stockport County and Tranmere Rovers.

Griffiths was with Dudley Town and Bristol Rovers before joining Bury with whom he made his league debut. He moved to Stockport County, playing 50 times before joining Tranmere Rovers. On leaving Tranmere, he joined Mossley, scoring twice in twelve games during the 1926–27 season.

References

Year of birth missing
Year of death missing
Bristol Rovers F.C. players
Bury F.C. players
Stockport County F.C. players
Tranmere Rovers F.C. players
Mossley A.F.C. players
English Football League players
Southern Football League players
Association football midfielders
English footballers
Dudley Town F.C. players